Swami Public Ltd. (Marathi: स्वामी पब्लिक लि.) is a 2014 Indian Marathi film starring Vikram Gokhale, Subodh Bhave, Chinmay Mandlekar late Vinay Apte in lead roles. The film is written & directed by Gajendra Ahire, produced by Poonam Shende under the banner Saarrthi Entertainment.

Plot
Siddharth (Chinmay Mandlekar) is a simpleton and socially aware young man. Having been brought up by his grandmother (Neena Kulkarni), he completes his MSW to work for social causes. However,  he is taken onthis path by a shrewd businessman Nachiket (Subodh Bhave). Nachiket is a master in marketing and packaging of ideas and concepts. Having understood this need of mental support by the masses, launches Siddharth as a Swami. Systematic & strategic planning, excellent communication and with perfect marketing, this Swami becomes a Brand.

Cast
 Chinmay Mandlekar as Siddharth/Swami
 Subodh Bhave as Nachiket
 Vikram Gokhale
 Vinay Apte
 Milind Shinde

Release
The film will be releasing all over the Maharashtra on 28 November 2014.

Soundtrack
Music of the film was composed by renowned music composer Uttam Singh, with lyrics penned by Gajendra Ahire & Ajay Chakravarty.
The background music was scored by Chaitanya Adkar.

References

External links
 

2014 films
Films directed by Gajendra Ahire
2010s Marathi-language films